Aritz Maestu Babarro (born 19 September 1990) is a Spanish former competitive pair skater. With his former skating partner, Laura Barquero, he is the 2018 Toruń Cup champion and 2018 International Challenge Cup champion, and competed for Spain at two World Championships.

Early career

Single skating 
Maestu began learning to skate in 2002. As a single skater, he was coached by Jonathan Levers in San Sebastián. He received one ISU Junior Grand Prix (JGP) assignment, in September 2008.

Partnership with Rodríguez 
Maestu's first pair skating partner was Alexandra Rodríguez Long. They competed two seasons together, beginning in 2010–2011. At JGP Austria in September 2011, they became the first pair to represent Spain in an international competition.

Rodríguez/Maestu skated at the 2012 World Junior Championships in Minsk, Belarus, but were eliminated after placing 12th in the preliminary round. Miguel Alegre and Emma Baxter coached the pair in Jaca, Spain.

Partnership with Grigorieva 
In September 2012, Maestu teamed up with Russia's Veronica Grigorieva to represent Spain on the senior level. The pair trained in Toruń (Poland) and Jaca (Spain), coached by Marius Siudek. Their international debut came in September 2013, at the Lombardia Trophy. A week later, they competed at the 2013 Nebelhorn Trophy, the final qualifying opportunity for the 2014 Winter Olympics. Their placement, 18th, was insufficient to qualify a spot at the Olympics.

Grigorieva/Maestu's final competition together was the 2014 European Championships, which took place in January in Budapest, Hungary. Ranked 20th in the short program, the pair did not advance to the free skate.

Partnership with Lech 
In 2014, Maestu teamed up with Poland's Marcelina Lech to compete for Spain. They made their international debut in February 2015, at the Bavarian Open.

Lech/Maestu placed 13th in the short program, 15th in the free skate, and 15th overall at the 2016 European Championships in Bratislava, Slovakia. They were coached by Dorota Siudek and Mariusz Siudek in Toruń, Poland.

Partnership with Barquero

2016–2017 season 
Maestu and Laura Barquero announced their partnership on 4 January 2017. They decided to train in Bergamo, Italy, coached by Barbara Luoni and Franca Bianconi. During their first season together, the pair was ineligible for international competitions due to the ISU's age requirements – Barquero was too young for senior events and Maestu too old for juniors.

2017–2018 season 
Making their international debut, Barquero/Maestu placed 7th at the 2017 CS Lombardia Trophy in mid-September. At the end of the month, they placed 13th at the 2017 CS Nebelhorn Trophy, the final qualifying opportunity for the 2018 Winter Olympics. Although their placement was not sufficient to qualify, Spain became the third alternate for a spot in the Olympic pairs' event.

In January, Barquero/Maestu placed eleventh at the 2018 European Championships in Moscow, Russia. The following month, they won gold at the Toruń Cup in Toruń, Poland, and at the International Challenge Cup in The Hague, Netherlands.  They concluded the season at the 2018 World Championships, in twentieth place.

2018–2019 season 
Barquero/Maestu began the season with two Challenger assignments, finishing fifth at the 2018 CS Lombardia Trophy and eighth at the 2018 CS Finlandia Trophy.  Making their Grand Prix debut with two assignments, they were seventh at the 2018 Grand Prix of Helsinki and sixth at 2018 NHK Trophy.  At the 2019 European Championships they were seventh, after taking their second consecutive national title.  Their final event together was the 2019 World Championships, where they placed fifteenth.

On May 31, 2019, it was announced that Maestu had suffered an injury that would involve a prolonged recovery, and in consequence of this the team had split.

Programs

Pairs with Barquero

Pairs with Lech

Pairs with Grigorieva

Pairs with Rodríguez

Men's singles

Competitive highlights 
GP: Grand Prix; CS: Challenger Series; JGP: Junior Grand Prix

Pairs with Barquero

Pairs with Lech

Pairs with Grigorieva

Pairs with Rodríguez

Men's singles

Detailed results

Small medals for short and free programs awarded only at ISU Championships.

With Barquero for Spain

References

External links 

 

1990 births
Spanish male pair skaters
Living people
Sportspeople from San Sebastián